Gauthami Nair is an Indian actress and director who is associated with Malayalam films. She made her silver screen debut in the 2012 movie Second Show.

Early life
Gauthami Nair was born to Madhu Nair and Sobha in Alappuzha. She has an elder sister, Gayathri.

She left her studies mid-way to pursue a career in films, but in 2012, she enrolled herself in a course in Psychology at the Government College for Women, Thiruvananthapuram. She went on to pursue masters at the same college and graduated with the second rank in the university exams.

Career
She started her acting career by starring in the Malayalam film Second Show. Her second film was Diamond Necklace in Malayalam, in which she starred with Fahadh Faasil and Samvrutha Sunil as a nurse. Her role as a Tamil girl and the charisma with which she carried herself around even when everything around her was collapsing in the film was very much appreciated. Her next Malayalam film Chapters, was also well received.

Personal life
She announced that she will marry someone working in the industry in March 2017 through online news portals, and married film-maker Srinath Rajendran on 2 April 2017. In 2023 she announced that they went separate ways after 3 years of marriage.

Filmography

Actor

Director

Awards
 Filmfare Award for Best Supporting Actress – Malayalam for Diamond Necklace

References

External links
 

Living people
Indian film actresses
Actresses from Alappuzha
Filmfare Awards South winners
Actresses in Malayalam cinema
21st-century Indian actresses
Year of birth missing (living people)